An Easter basket, also known as a Paschal basket, is traditionally, a basket containing the foods traditionally forbidden to consume during Lent (meat, eggs, and dairy products), that is blessed by a priest for breaking the Lenten fast. This continues to be normative in Eastern Christianity and Easter baskets are typically blessed before the midnight service on Holy Saturday, with their contents being consumed at the feast after the service.

In parts Western Christianity, emphasis is placed on making a Lenten sacrifice (giving up pleasures such as chocolate and cookies) rather than the traditional abstinence from meat, lacticinia and wine (though a few congregations have revived this practice); as such, in countries of the Western world such as the United States, Easter baskets are filled with Easter eggs and sweets after having abstained from them during Lent.

Traditional

Traditions for Easter in Eastern European countries often includes blessing of baskets.

Western Christianity

Poland
In Poland, Święconka or "the blessing of the Easter baskets" is a central tradition on Holy Saturday.  The tradition dates back to the 13-14th century in its earliest form. The basket is traditionally lined with a white linen or lace napkin and decorated with sprigs of boxwood (bukszpan), the typical Easter evergreen. Baskets containing a sampling of Easter foods are brought to church to be blessed on Holy Saturday. After the blessing, the baskets of food are then set aside until Easter morning.

Modern innovations

United States

Congregations and synods belonging to the Evangelical Lutheran Church in America, have made Easter baskets to be given to needy children or elderly persons. These have been filled with Easter eggs, candy, and toys.

An Easter tradition involves the Easter Bunny dropping off a gift basket of candy for good children overnight. Children leave a basket out overnight which the Easter bunny fills with candy, toys, and gifts on the night before Easter, and children wake up to find their Easter basket. Easter baskets are also used in Easter egg hunts, in which children try filling their basket with Easter eggs.

References

Notes

Citations

Easter food
Basket weaving
Easter Bunny
Easter liturgy